The Catania International Open or Open Internazionale di Catania was a men's and women's international tennis tournament founded in 1959 as the Catania International or Internazionale di Catania and was played on outdoor clay courts in Catania, Sicily, Italy. The tournament was only held until 1978.

History
The Catania International Open was a men's and women's international tennis tournament founded in 1959 as the Catania International and was played on outdoor clay courts in Catania, Sicily, Italy. The tournament was only held until 1978.

Finals

Men's Singles
(incomplete roll)

Men's Doubles

Women's Singles
(incomplete roll)

Women's Doubles

References

Clay court tennis tournaments
Defunct tennis tournaments in Italy